is a 2013 Japanese animated science fiction film produced by White Fox. It is a follow-up to the 2011 anime television series Steins;Gate, which was based on the video game of the same name, and is part of the Science Adventure franchise. The film premiered in Japanese theaters in April 2013.

Plot

The film takes place in August 2011, one year after the events of the anime series. After going through a painstaking journey across multiple 'World Lines' due to the invention of 'D-Mail', text messages that can be sent to the past, Rintaro Okabe has assumedly landed in the "Steins Gate" World Line, in which he was able to prevent the deaths of both Mayuri Shiina and Kurisu Makise, as well as prevent a future ruled by CERN due to the invention of a time machine that no longer exists. On August 3, Kurisu arrives in Japan for a press conference and reunites with all the members of the Future Gadget Laboratory. Meanwhile, Rintaro starts having intense side effects from his time travels, seeing visions of alternate Worldlines. The next day on August 4, a mysterious visitor shows up at Kurisu's hotel, telling her to remember three things: a cell phone, a microwave oven, and CERN. Later that day, as Kurisu is talking to Rintaro about how her own instances of déjà vu may be similar to Rintaro's 'Reading Steiner' ability to remember things from other World Lines, Rintaro suddenly disappears before Kurisu's eyes. Furthermore, no one else seems to remember Rintaro ever existed, with Kurisu barely retaining a faint memory of someone.

A week later on August 11, as Kurisu finds a fork that Rintaro left behind and remembers the words the stranger left her, she learns Itaru "Daru" Hashida had for some reason hacked CERN, suddenly giving her the urge to build a Time Leap machine. Using the machine, Kurisu leaps back to the night of August 3, where she observes Rintaro disappearing and reappearing from existence, with everyone's memories of him changing accordingly. She is then contacted by the visitor from before, revealed to be Suzuha Amane, who came from the future using a time machine Kurisu built. She explains to both Kurisu and Rintaro that all the memories of World Lines Rintaro had visited is overloading his Reading Steiner, causing him to fluctuate between the current world line and the "R" world line, the only other world line where neither Mayuri nor Kurisu die. Suzuha states the only way to save him from vanishing completely is to use a time machine to travel to the past, but Rintaro ostensibly refuses, as he feels neither time machines nor time leap machines should exist and doesn't want Kurisu to go through the same suffering he went through, saying he would rather disappear to allow her and Mayuri to live in peace. He instead urges Kurisu to forget about him, leaving her with a kiss.

As Rintaro disappears once again the next day, Kurisu breaks down in tears before grudgingly deciding to accept his wish and try to forget him. Later, on August 13, as the Future Gadget Lab gets word that it might have to close up, Kurisu is once again approached by Suzuha, who tells her that she is not being honest with her own feelings, eventually convincing Kurisu to go with her in her time machine. In order to keep Rintaro in the Steins Gate world line, he must be implanted with a powerful memory that helps distinguish it from other world lines. The two travel back to June 30, 2005, where Kurisu attempts to talk with the young Rintaro, only to result in him getting into a car accident instead, leaving her too afraid to attempt another trip to the past. Back in the present, Kurisu discovers Mayuri and the others also possess faint memories of Rintaro, which are soon awakened when she does an imitation of his persona, Kyouma Hououin. Encouraged by everyone's feelings, Kurisu returns to the past, this time succeeding in her mission by implanting the concept of Kyouma Hououin into Rintaro's mind and giving him his first kiss, which led him to take on his 'mad scientist' persona to protect Mayuri. With this, Kurisu manages to bring Rintaro back to the Steins Gate world line and the movie ends with Rintaro asking Kurisu if she will return his first kiss to him. Smiling, Kurisu says "Never".

Production
Steins;Gate: Fuka Ryōiki no Déjà vu was first announced at the end of the anime television series on September 13, 2011.

The film was released in both DVD and Blu-ray Disc home video versions in Japan on December 13, 2013. Several versions were released; a standard DVD edition, a standard Blu-ray Disc edition, a five-disc combo pack containing several radio dramas, and a six-disc combo pack containing the radio dramas in addition to the film's soundtrack. Additional items were shipped depending on the retailer. The Japanese release also includes English subtitles. Funimation released the film on Blu-ray Disc/DVD in North America on March 28, 2017.

Release
The film premiered in Japanese theaters on April 20, 2013 and was released on BD/DVD on December 13, 2013. The film has been licensed in North America by Funimation, and it was released in English in March 2017.

Reception
The film debuted as the number 7  movie of the weekend; making 86,822,800 yen ($874,130 USD) across 18 theaters in Japan. It later went on to make 319,125,723 yen ($3,142,750 USD) at the box office, but dropped to the number 12 spot by its third weekend. Chiyomaru Shikura later reported via his Twitter page that the movie had grossed over 500 million yen ($5,000,000 USD). He additionally revealed that he had accepted only a single yen as a royalty fee from the film. During their coverage of the upcoming Blu-ray and DVD release, Famitsu reported that the film had grossed over 550 million yen ($5,600,000 USD).

Richard Eisenbeis and Toshi Nakamura of Kotaku stated, "This movie really lives or dies on how well you connect to Kurisu and Okabe— and given the amazing performances of their voice actors, I can't imagine not being able to," and proceeded to call it, "An excellent epilogue to the Steins;Gate story."

Other media
A manga adaptation by Reki Kugayama was serialized in Kadokawa Shoten's Shōnen Ace magazine between the May and December 2013 issues, released on March 26 and October 26, 2013, respectively. The series was collected in two volumes, released on April 24 and December 26, 2013. A two-volume novel series, written by Tatsuya Hamazaki and illustrated by Huke, Kyūta Sakai, and Bun150, was published by Kadokawa Shoten under their Kadokawa Sneaker Bunko imprint. The two volumes were released on May 1 and June 1, 2013.

References

External links
  
 
 

2013 films
2013 anime films
2010s Japanese-language films
Anime films based on video games
Funimation
White Fox
Mystery anime and manga
Japanese animated science fiction films
2010s science fiction films
Science Adventure
Shōnen manga
Foreign films set in the United States